The 2013 Supercupa României was the 15th edition of Romania's season opener cup competition. The game was contested between Liga I title holders, Steaua București, and Romanian Cup winners, Petrolul Ploiești. It was played at Arena Națională in Bucharest on July 10. Steaua won the trophy, scoring three goals while Petrolul did not scored. 29,459 people attended the match.

Match

Details

References

External links
Romania - List of Super Cup Finals, RSSSF.com

2013–14 in Romanian football
Supercupa României
FC Steaua București matches
FC Petrolul Ploiești